The 2014 New Zealand National Rugby Sevens Tournament known as the Bayleys National Sevens was hosted in Rotorua, New Zealand, on the 11 and 12 January 2014. Matches were played at the Rotorua International Stadium. Sixteen men's and ten women's provincial teams qualified to compete in the annual national tournament following three regional tournaments (Southern, Central and Northern regions) in November and December.

Format
Teams from the 26 Provincial Unions have to qualify to attend at the National Event in Rotorua. The teams are divided into pools of four teams, who play a round-robin within the pool. The top two teams in each pool advanced to the Cup competition. The four quarterfinal losers dropped into the bracket for the Plate. The Bowl was contested by the third- and fourth-place finishers in each pool, with the losers in the Bowl quarterfinals dropping into the bracket for the Shield.

Teams
Teams from each Provincial Unions have to qualify to attend at the National Event in Rotorua. The qualification series started off at Fraser Park in Timaru on the 23 November 2013 for the Southern region. Then the Central region qualification was played on 7 December 2013 at the Massey University Rugby Institute in Palmerston North. The series the finished in Hamilton at Waikato Stadium on 14 December 2013 for the Northern region qualification.

Southern region

Central region

Northern region

Pool stage
The first round, or pool stage, sees 16 men's teams divided into four pools of four teams. Each pool was a round-robin of six games, where each team played one match against each of the other teams in the same pool. Teams were awarded three points for a win, two points for a draw and one for a defeat.

The teams finishing in the top two of each pool advanced to the cup quarterfinals.

Pool A

Pool B

Pool C

Pool D

Knockout stage

Shield

Bowl

Plate

Cup

References

External links
 Official site
 NZ Sevens Magazine

2014 in New Zealand rugby union
New Zealand National Rugby Sevens Tournament
Sport in Rotorua